Hydrangea peruviana is a species of shrub or woody climber in the flowering plant family Hydrangeaceae. It is native to Central America and South America.

References

Hydrangea
Flora of Peru